HMS Babet was a 20-gun sixth-rate post ship of the British Royal Navy. She had previously been a corvette of the French Navy under the name Babet, until her capture in 1794, during the French Revolutionary Wars. She served with the British, capturing several privateers and other vessels, and was at the Battle of Groix. She disappeared in the Caribbean in 1800, presumably having foundered.

French career and capture
Babet was built at Le Havre, one of a two-ship Prompte class of 20-gun corvettes built to a design by Joseph-Marie-Blaise Coulomb.

In the Bay of Biscay, on 18 May 1793, Captain Andrew Snape Douglas's  captured her sister, Prompte, which the Royal Navy took into service as HMS Prompte. Babet was laid down in September 1792, fitted out in May 1793 and launched on 12 December 1793.

Her commander from 9 January 1793 to October was lieutenant de vaisseau Rolland. Rolland's replacement on 23 October was enseigne de vaisseau non entretenu Pierre-Joseph-Paul Belhomme.

Babets French career was brief. Under Belhomme's command she sailed from Havre to Cherbourg via La Hogue. She then cruised the Channel before sailing from Honfleur to Cherbourg, on to Brest, and returning to Cancale. She was part of a squadron consisting of two frigates (Pomone and Engageante) and another corvette that a British squadron under John Borlase Warren engaged off the Île de Batz in the action of 23 April 1794.  and  captured Babet and brought her into Portsmouth, arriving on 30 April. The action had cost Babet some 30 to 40 of her crew killed and wounded. Flora had one man killed and three wounded; Arethusa had three men killed and five wounded.

British career
Babet was registered for service on 19 June 1794, and was commissioned in December that year under Captain the Honourable John Murray, for service with Lord Howe's fleet. Captain Joshua Mulock replaced Murray in April 1795 while Babet was being fitted for service at Portsmouth, a process completed on 10 May that year, having cost £2,544. Captain Edward Codrington replaced Mulock; Babet was Codrington's first command after he had made post captain

Codrington then sailed Babet to join Lord Bridport's fleet. On 23 June 1795 she was with the fleet at the battle of Groix. In 1847, the Admiralty awarded any remaining survivors who claimed it, the Naval General Service Medal with clasp "23rd June 1795".

Captain William Lobb replaced Codrington in December 1795 and sailed Babet to the Leeward Islands in February the following year. There Babet was present at the capture of Demerara on 23 April, and the capture of Berbice on 2 May 1796.

In July 1796, Babet, Prompte,  and  captured the Catherina Christina in July 1796. At some point Babet sailed in company with Prompte and the two vessels captured the Danish brig Eland Fanoe. On 23 July, Scipio, Babet, Pique and Prompte shared in the capture of the Ariel and the Zee Nymphe.

On 16 September , Scipio and Babet captured the John and Mary. Thorn captured the schooner Abigail on 24 September. This time the first, fourth and fifth-class shares were shared with Scipio, Babet, Madras and Prompte. Then on 16 November Thorn and  captured the Spanish schooner Del Carmen. Once again the first, fourth and fifth class shares were shared with Scipio, Babet, Madras and Prompte.

On 10 January 1797, Babet and  drove a small French privateer schooner ashore on Deseada. They tried to use the privateer Legere, of six guns and 48 men, which Bellona had captured three days earlier, to retrieve the schooner that was on shore. In the effort, both French privateers were destroyed. Then Babet chased a brig, which had been a prize to the schooner, ashore. The British were unable to get her off so they destroyed her.

Captain Jemmett Mainwaring took command of Babet in June 1797. Between 25 July and 5 October  Babet captured three merchant vessels:
brig Decision (or Decisive or Maria), of 200 tons and eight men, recaptured while sailing from Cape to Puerto Rico in ballast;
brig Schylhill (probably Schuylkill), of Philadelphia, of 100 tons and eight men, sailing from New York to Puerto Rico with a cargo of flour, supposedly Spanish property; and
barque Æolus, of Copenhagen and of 180 tons and 10 men, sailing from Marseilles to St. Thomas, with a cargo of wine, French property.

Then on 16 January 1798 Babets boats captured the French schooner Désirée. The schooner was sailing towards Babet as Babet was sailing between Martinique and Dominique. As soon as the schooner realized that Babet was a British warship she attempted to escape. The wind failed and the schooner then took to her sweeps. Lieutenant Samuel Pym of Babet took 24 men in her pinnace and launch and went after the schooner. After rowing several leagues the boats closed to within range of their cannon, which they then commenced to fire. The British closed on their quarry despite a strong counter-fire. The British then boarded Désirée and took her. She was armed with six guns and had a crew of 46 men. The British lost one man killed and five wounded; the French had three men killed and 15 wounded. Désirée was six days out of Guadeloupe and had taken one American brig that had been sailing from St. Vincent to Boston.

Babet was refitted at Portsmouth between July and December 1798 at a cost of £5,194. Then, in December she recaptured the American ship Helena.

On 18 and 19 January 1799, Babet captured two French fishing vessels, Deux Freres Unis, with a cargo of herring, and the Jacques Charles. On 3 June Babet was in company with  when they captured the John. Then on 24 June they captured the ship Weloverdagt.

Then Babet took part in the Anglo-Russian invasion of Holland in 1799. There she briefly served as Vice-Admiral Andrew Mitchell's flagship in the Zuider Zee. On 28 August 1799, the fleet captured several Dutch hulks and ships in the New Diep, in Holland. Babet was listed among the vessels qualifying to share in the prize money. However, by the time this was awarded in February 1802, Babet had been lost at sea. Similarly, Babet was also present at the subsequent Vlieter Incident on 30 August.

Babet was among the numerous vessels that shared in the proceeds after  cut out the French frigate Desirée from Dunkirk harbour on 8 July 1800.

Fate
Babet left Spithead on 14 September 1800, arrived at Fort Royal Bay, Martinique, on 24 October, and sailed the next day for Jamaica. She was not seen again; she had probably foundered at sea during a tropical storm.

General John Knox was a passenger on Babet. He was sailing out to Jamaica to take up the position of Governor. With him were his aide-de-camp, and possibly some other members of his entourage or other passengers.

See also
List of people who disappeared mysteriously at sea
List of ships captured in the 18th century

Notes, citations, and references
Notes

Citations

References

 
 
 
 
 
 
 
  
 

 

1793 ships
1800s missing person cases
Age of Sail corvettes of France
Captured ships
Maritime incidents in 1801
Missing ships
People lost at sea
Post ships of the Royal Navy
Ships built in France
Shipwrecks in the Caribbean Sea
Warships lost with all hands